Victor di Mello (July 18, 1940 – April 27, 2011) was a Brazilian actor, film director and screenwriter born in Rio de Janeiro, Brazil.

Filmography

As director
 1989 - Solidão, Uma Linda História de Amor
 1981 - O Sequestro
 1980 - Giselle
 1979 - Copa 78 - O Poder do Futebol
 1978 - Assim Era a Pornochanchada
 1978 - Os Melhores Momentos da Pornochanchada
 1977 - A Mulata Que Queria Pecar
 1976 - As Desquitadas em Lua de Mel
 1974 - Essa Gostosa Brincadeira a Dois
 1974 - Um Varão entre as Mulheres
 1973 - Como É Boa a Nossa Empregada
 1972 - O Grande Gozador
 1971 - Quando as Mulheres Paqueram
 1970 - Ascensão e Queda de um Paquera
 1970 - Os Maridos Traem... as Mulheres Subtraem

As actor

In cinema
 1975 - Os Maniacos Eróticos (from  Alberto Salvá)
 1975 - O Padre Que Queria Pecar (from  Lenine Otoni)
 1972 - Revólveres Não Cospem Flores (from  Alberto Salvá)
 1968 - A Noite do Meu Bem (from Jece Valadão)
 1968 - A Doce Mulher Amada (from Ruy Santos)
 1968 - Engraçadinha Depois dos Trinta (from J. B. Tanko)

In tv
 2007 - O Profeta  .... Genaro
 2006 - Belíssima .... Humberto Moraes

References

2011 deaths
1940 births
Brazilian male film actors
Brazilian film directors